Physalaemus lisei is a species of frog in the family Leptodactylidae.
It is endemic to Brazil.
Its natural habitats are subtropical or tropical moist lowland forests, moist savanna, and intermittent freshwater marshes.
It is threatened by habitat loss.

References

lisei
Endemic fauna of Brazil
Taxonomy articles created by Polbot
Amphibians described in 1977